Odetta bosyuensis is a species of sea snail, a marine gastropod mollusk in the family Pyramidellidae, the pyrams and their allies.

Distribution
This marine species occurs in the benthic zone off the Philippines, Korea, Japan.

References

 Okutani T., ed. (2000) Marine mollusks in Japan. Tokai University Press. 1173 pp. page(s): 729
 Poppe, G.T. 2010 Philippine marine mollusks: III. Gastropoda Part 3 and Bivalvia Part 1. ConchBooks:Hackenheim. 665 pp.

External links
 

Pyramidellidae
Gastropods described in 1937